The 2013–14 St. Bonaventure Bonnies men's basketball team represented St. Bonaventure University during the 2013–14 NCAA Division I men's basketball season. The Bonnies, led by seventh year head coach Mark Schmidt, played their home games at the Reilly Center and were members of the Atlantic 10 Conference. They finished the season 18–15, 6–10 in A-10 play to finish in ninth place. They advanced to the semifinals of the A-10 tournament where they lost to Saint Joseph's. Despite an overall winning record that included an upset over top-ranked Saint Louis in the A-10 tournament quarterfinals, the Bonnies were not invited to a postseason bid due to an inability to come to an agreement with the College Basketball Invitational.

Roster

Schedule

|-
!colspan=9 style="background:#7B3F00; color:#FFFFFF;"|  Exhibition

|-
!colspan=9 style="background:#7B3F00; color:#FFFFFF;"|  Regular season

|-
!colspan=9 style="background:#7B3F00; color:#FFFFFF;"| Atlantic 10 tournament

References

St. Bonaventure Bonnies men's basketball seasons
St. Bonaventure